Spinaeschna is a genus of dragonflies in the family Telephlebiidae.
These dragonflies are endemic to eastern Australia,
where they inhabit streams and rivers.

Species of Spinaeschna are medium to large, dark brown dragonflies with greenish-yellow markings.

Species
The genus Spinaeschna includes the following two species:

Spinaeschna tripunctata  – southern cascade darner
Spinaeschna watsoni  – northern cascade darner

See also
 List of Odonata species of Australia

References

Telephlebiidae
Anisoptera genera
Odonata of Australia
Endemic fauna of Australia
Taxa named by Günther Theischinger
Insects described in 1982